Great Evander was a New Zealand standardbred racehorse. As a notable champion, he was inducted into the New Zealand Trotting Hall of Fame.

See also
 Harness racing in New Zealand

References

New Zealand standardbred racehorses
New Zealand Trotting Hall of Fame horses
1952 racehorse births